Jakub Brabec (born 6 August 1992) is a Czech professional footballer who plays as a centre-back for Greek Super League club Aris and the Czech national team.

Club career
Jakub was part of the youth system at Sparta Prague, but having been released in the summer of 2008 he joined Viktoria Žižkov, another Prague-based club. He was promoted to the Žižkov first team during the 2008–09 Gambrinus liga season, when he was still at school. He made one league appearance for the club in this season, playing a full match against FC Viktoria Plzen as a 16-year-old in a 2–0 defeat.

In the 2009–10 season, he played a further 14 games for Žižkov, who were then playing in the second tier Czech 2. Liga. One of the fourteen appearances was as a substitute. In one match in this season, against FC Zenit Čáslav, he received a 31st-minute red card. He made six appearances in the Czech 2. Liga in the following 2010–11 season, four of which were as a substitute. He helped Žižkov achieve a second-place league finish and promotion back to the Gambrinus liga.

In June 2011, he secured a move back to Sparta Prague, for an undisclosed fee. He told Uefa.com that his primary motivation for making the transfer was that he was a childhood fan of his former club and that he would have a better chance of playing in the Uefa Cup and the Uefa Champions League. He started the 2011–12 season with the reserve team, Sparta Prague II, who compete in the 2. Liga.

On August 31, Jakub signed a 4 year deal with Genk, where he will be playing as a centre back/right back.

Aris
On 31 August 2021, Aris officially announced the signing of Brabec for an undisclosed fee on a three-year contract. On 18 October 2021, he scored his first goal sealing a precious 1-0 away win against Lamia.

After a first season that saw him form a compact pair with Fabiano Leismann, Brabec signed a contract extension until the summer of 2025, on 28 July 2022.

International career
Jakub has represented the Czech Republic at youth international level. He scored his first national goal on his third and final appearance for the Czech Republic under-18s in a 3–1 loss to the Austria under-18s in a March 2010 friendly match.

Later in 2009, he made his debut for the Czech Republic under-19s in a 4–0 win over the Malta under-19s.

He was selected as captain of the Czech Republic under-19s squad for the 2011 UEFA European Under-19 Championship. His first goal at under-19 level came in this tournament. He scored a header in a group game tournament fixture against the Republic of Ireland under-19s to equalise 1–1 on 23 July 2011; the Czechs went on to win 2–1. The Czech Republic finished the tournament as losing finalists to Spain.

Career statistics

Club

International goals
Scores and results list the Czech Republic's goal tally first.

Honours
 Czech First League
Winner: 2013–14

 Czech 2. Liga
Runner Up: 2010–11

 Czech Cup
Winner: 2013–14

 UEFA European Under-19 Football Championship
Runner Up: 2011
Individual
UEFA European Under-19 Championship Team of the Tournament: 2011
Czech First League Defender of the Year: 2019–20

References

External links
 Profile at Zbrojovka Brno

1992 births
Living people
Footballers from Prague
Czech footballers
Czech Republic international footballers
Czech Republic under-21 international footballers
Czech Republic youth international footballers
Association football defenders
Czech First League players
Czech National Football League players
AC Sparta Prague players
FK Viktoria Žižkov players
FC Zbrojovka Brno players
K.R.C. Genk players
Çaykur Rizespor footballers
FC Viktoria Plzeň players
Aris Thessaloniki F.C. players
Belgian Pro League players
Super League Greece players
UEFA Euro 2020 players
Czech expatriate footballers
Expatriate footballers in Belgium
Expatriate footballers in Turkey
Expatriate footballers in Greece
Czech expatriate sportspeople in Belgium
Czech expatriate sportspeople in Turkey
Czech expatriate sportspeople in Greece